The northern hawk-owl or northern hawk owl (Surnia ulula) is a medium-sized true owl of the northern latitudes.  It is non-migratory and usually stays within its breeding range, though it sometimes irrupts southward. It is one of the few owls that is neither nocturnal nor crepuscular, being active only during the day. This is the only living species in the genus Surnia of the family Strigidae, the "typical" owls (as opposed to barn owls, Tytonidae). The species is sometimes called simply the hawk owl; however, many species of owls in the genus Ninox are also called "hawk owls".

Taxonomy
The northern hawk-owl was formally described by the Swedish naturalist Carl Linnaeus in 1758 in the tenth edition of his Systema Naturae under the binomial name Strix ulula. The owl is now the only species placed in the genus Surnia that was introduced in 1805 by André Duméril. The type species was designated by George Robert Gray in 1840  as the northern hawk-owl. The genus name is of unknown etymology and may simply have been invented by Duméril. The specific epithet ulula is Latin for a "screech owl".

A molecular phylogenetic study  of the owls published in 2019 found that the northern hawk-owl is sister to a clade containing the pygmy owls in the genus Glaucidium.
 
Three subspecies are recognised:
 S. u. tianschanica Smallbones, 1906 – central Asia to northern China and northern Mongolia
 S. u. ulula (Linnaeus, 1758) – northern Eurasia
 S. u. caparoch (Müller, PLS, 1776) – northern North America

Description
The northern hawk-owl plumage is relatively dark brown with an off-white spotting pattern on all dorsal parts of the body with the exception of the back of the neck which boasts a black v-shaped pattern. The underbelly is generally white or off-white which continues to the toes with brown bands on the breast and stomach. It also has a long tail with brown banding. The northern hawk-owl has a smokey white face with a black border, a flat head, yellow eyes and a yellow curved beak.

The northern hawk-owl has been said to resemble a hawk in appearance and in behavior. In North America, its appearance in flight is often considered similar to a Cooper's hawk (Accipiter cooperii). It has been suggested that this may be because the hawk-owl may partially fill an important diurnal niche similar to that of day hunters such as hawks.

Vocalization
Various calls are used by the different sexes in different situations. When attracting a mate the male usually lets out a rolled whistle of ulululululululul and a sound similar to tu-wita-wit, tiwita-tu-wita, wita, when perching at a potential nest site. The female's call is usually less constant and more shrill.

When alerting to danger, the northern hawk-owl lets out a sound similar to rike, rike, rike, rike. It also releases a high-pitched scream followed by a yip when an intruder is near to the nest. To warn of impending dangers to a fledgling, the hawk-owl will let out a noise similar to ki ki kikikikiki. Calls can vary in length from 15 s to 2 min.

Distribution and habitat
Three subspecies exist across the northern holarctic. The North American subspecies S. u. caparoch spans from eastern Alaska through Canada to Newfoundland and in some areas extends south into northern United States. The other two subspecies are found in northeastern Europe and Siberia: S. u. tianschanica breeds in Central Asia reaching Xinjiang (China); and S. u. ulula resides across Siberia reaching its most eastern range.

Occasionally, S. u. caparoch can extend its territory as far south as northern Minnesota and many other states in the northern United States including more central states such as West Virginia, New York, and South Dakota. These southern forays into the northern United States are rare and generally occur during winter, or following an explosion in a population of prey. S. u. caparoch can occasionally be found in more southern areas such as Great Britain, southern Russia and Scandinavia, following explosions of prey.

Northern hawk-owls are unevenly distributed and highly variable throughout the boreal forest. They live mostly in open coniferous forests, or coniferous forests mixed with deciduous species such as larch, birch, poplar, and willow. They are found in muskegs, clearings, swamp valleys, meadows, or recently burnt areas, and generally avoid dense spruce-fir forests. Their winter habitat is usually the same as the breeding habitat.

Behaviour and ecology

Breeding

The northern hawk-owl generally starts its mating rituals at the beginning of March. After calling and pairing is complete the northern hawk-owl will build a nest and start to lay eggs. On average the northern hawk-owl will lay 3–11 eggs per brood. The nest sites are usually the tops of hollow stumps of old dead spruce trees. The specific dates of egg appearance can be quite variable depending on locality. In central Canada eggs are usually laid from 30 March to 5 June. On Newfoundland the appearance of eggs occurs later, between 9 May and 11 June. In Finland, however, eggs can be found anywhere between 30 March to 23 June.

For the most part, the female northern hawk-owl does the incubating of the eggs, whilst the male forages for food. Once the chicks have hatched their roles shift drastically. At about two weeks into the chicks' lives, the female starts to leave the nest for long spans of time (5 hours or more). This span of time is presumably when the female hunts. The male, however, will guard the nest diligently until the chicks leave. When predators (usually other raptors) fly nearby, the male will sometimes chase them away from the nest if he feels it is necessary. Once the owlets have grown to a size which allows less parental supervision, they will leave the nest. This occurs on average after their 21st day, and can begin as early as mid-June. After this the female will provide most of the care. However, the male will remain close and will still feed his young on occasion.
The northern hawk-owl has also been known to nest on cliffsides. It has little fear of humans, and will attack if the young are approached too closely.

Food and feeding
The northern hawk-owl feeds on a variety of prey, which can include small rodents to mammals more robust in size, and a variety of birds — a typical diet for many boreal owls. In Eurasia the northern hawk-owl is known to feed primarily on voles from the Microtus family. These voles usually follow a 3–4 year cycle of abundance. Therefore, S. u. ulula numbers are affected negatively when the numbers of voles are lowest. In North America the subspecies S. u. caparoch also feeds upon microtine voles, but its population is primarily based on the ten-year cycling of the snowshoe hare (Lepus americanus). In Eurasia the northern hawk-owl's biomass consists of about 94% microtine voles, whereas in North America the percentage of biomass contributed by voles can be as low as 20%. Juvenile hares are considerably more important at 40–50%.

Other animals that are important prey items for the northern hawk-owl include the red squirrel (Sciurus vulgaris) which has been documented to contribute as much as 20% to the hawk-owl's biomass. A long list of others includes mice, rats, voles, lemmings, the short-tail weasel (Mustela erminea), partridge, spruce grouse (Falcipennis canadensis), doves, pileated woodpeckers (Dryocopus pileatus), sparrows, jays, robins, starlings, buntings, grackles, and finches. In the winter, feeding strategies change: where in summer the main source of food is mammals, in the winter a bigger portion of the hawk-owl's biomass consists of ground-dwelling birds, such as the ptarmigan and the grouse.

The northern hawk-owl is a partially diurnal hunter, although it has been recorded hunting at varying times and does not appear to have a preferred hunting time. Whether the bird resides in Eurasia or North America, the strategy is usually similar. The northern hawk-owl will perch and scour the immediate area for prey. As these owls are considered a search-oriented species, they likely do not stay put for long if the site is not producing prey. The hawk-owl prefers open, forest-type environments when perching. These environments include sphagnum bogs and partially deforested areas. The preferred perching tree of the northern hawk-owl is the spruce tree. When the hawk-owl attacks, it goes from a horizontal posture into a gliding dive. If the prey is further away, the bird will flap its wings a few times during the dive to increase distance. The hawk-owl has exceptional hearing and can plunge into snow to capture rodents below the surface.

The type of prey the hawk-owl catches will determine its eating strategy. For mammalian prey the ritual is generally the same: the northern hawk-owl will eviscerate its prey, eat the head first (especially for prey like the red squirrel, whose head is fairly large), and then — when tackling larger prey — it will eat the organs and cache the remains; with smaller prey, the owl will simply swallow the body whole.

Conservation and status
Due to its low density occurrence, sporadic fluctuations, and remote breeding locations, the northern hawk-owl is one of the least studied and poorly understood birds in North America. As a result, it is almost impossible to properly estimate its numbers.

In Yukon, northern hawk-owl densities were estimated to be between zero and six pairs per . Despite these low densities, the North American population is thought to be fairly large given that they occur throughout the boreal forest. Duncan and Harris (1997) estimated that this population contains between 10,000 and 50,000 pairs.

Populations are known to fluctuate with cycles of small rodents  and irruptions are known to occur in sub-boreal regions throughout the world. In Scandinavia, populations have been reported to vary from a few hundred birds in certain years to over 4000 birds in others and even up to 10,000 breeding pairs in optimal years. Irruptions can be used as indicators of small mammal abundance  and in eastern North America, southern irruptions have been linked with low densities of red-backed voles in the high boreal forest.

In North America, over 50% of the northern hawk-owls' breeding territory occurs in non-commercial boreal forests  and as long as nothing threatens their northern habitats, no known factors challenge their existence. However, it is unknown what effects modern forestry would have on population levels because although it would decrease nesting localities, it would simultaneously create ideal habitat for Microtus prey. Fire suppression by humans is believed to negatively affect northern hawk-owl populations by reducing open areas for hunting and dead wood to nest in.

The status and conservation of this species is uncertain. A report by the Committee On the Status of Endangered Wildlife In Canada (COSEWIC) recommended that no designation be assigned for the northern hawk-owl. Compared to the nineteenth century, southern irruptions in the New and Old World appear to have declined. Also, North American populations seem to be declining, although no proper documentation exists to confirm this trend. In Canada, it was ranked 85th overall to set conservation, research, or monitoring priorities. Downes et al. (2000) considered the hawk-owl to be of medium concern, but with a high priority to improve monitoring.

In falconry
The northern hawk-owl is considered a falconry bird in Ontario, and may be used to hunt small game with a proper license.

References

External links

 
 Northern Hawk-Owl Species Account – Cornell Lab of Ornithology
 Northern Hawk-Owl – eNature.com
 Northern Hawk-Owl Stamps at bird-stamps.org

Northern Hawk-Owl information at owlpages.com
Northern Hawk-Owl profile at the Government of Canada Species at Risk Public Registry
 Northern hawk-owl. Video of male, female and chicks.
 

northern hawk-owl
Holarctic birds
northern hawk-owl
northern hawk-owl